Muhamed Alaim (born 10 February 1981) is a Bosnian retired professional football goalkeeper.

Club career
Alaim played 10 years for FK Sarajevo and appeared in 270 league games for the club. He finished his career with Iranian second tier side Tarbiat Yazd, where he played from 2010 to 2012.

International career
On the national level, Alaim has made one appearance for the Bosnia and Herzegovina national team on 22 August 2007, in a friendly match against Croatia as a second-half substitute for Adnan Gušo.

After football 
Currently he is the founder and a coach at his goalkeeping school in Sarajevo. The school accepts all the way from young goalkeepers to veterans.

He is also active in politics as a member of the Party of Democratic Action (SDA).

Honours

Player

Club
Sarajevo
Bosnian Premier League: 2006–07
Bosnian Cup: 2001–02, 2004–05

References

External links

1981 births
Living people
Footballers from Sarajevo
Association football goalkeepers
Bosnia and Herzegovina footballers
Bosnia and Herzegovina international footballers
FK Sarajevo players
Tarbiat Yazd players
Premier League of Bosnia and Herzegovina players
Azadegan League players
Bosnia and Herzegovina expatriate footballers
Expatriate footballers in Iran
Bosnia and Herzegovina expatriate sportspeople in Iran